(also written 2015 BP513) is an Apollo near-Earth asteroid roughly 12–27 meters in diameter that passed less than 1 lunar distance from Earth on 18 January 2015.

2015 flyby
Until 18 January 2015 18:00 UT the small dim asteroid either had an elongation less than 45 degrees from the Sun or was significantly fainter than apparent magnitude 23. On 18 January 2015 13:36 UT the asteroid passed  from the Moon and at 17:09 UT passed  from Earth. The asteroid was not discovered until 9 days later on 27 January 2015 by Pan-STARRS at an apparent magnitude of 21 using a  Ritchey–Chrétien telescope. Two precovery images from 19 January 2015 when the asteroid was apparent magnitude 16 were then located.

References

External links 
 
 
 

Minor planet object articles (unnumbered)

20150118
20150127